The Quadel Seniors Classic was a golf tournament on the Champions Tour from 1983 to 1985. It was played in Boca Raton, Florida at the Boca Grove Plantation.

The purse for the 1985 tournament was US$200,000, with $30,000 going to the winner. The tournament was founded in 1983 as the Boca Grove Seniors Classic.

Winners
Quadel Seniors Classic
1985 Gary Player
1984 Arnold Palmer

Boca Grove Seniors Classic
1983 Arnold Palmer

Source:

References

Former PGA Tour Champions events
Golf in Florida
Recurring sporting events established in 1983
Recurring events disestablished in 1985
1983 establishments in Florida
1985 disestablishments in Florida